Frank Rommel (born 30 July 1984 in Suhl) is a German retired skeleton racer who began competing internationally in 2002. He won two medals at the FIBT World Championships with a gold in the mixed team (2009) and a bronze in the men's skeleton event 2008.

Rommel also finished 24th in the men's skeleton event at the 2006 Winter Olympics in Turin. He qualified for the 2010 Winter Olympics, finishing seventh. Rommel retired from the sport after the 2014 Winter Olympics where he finished 11th.

References

External links

 
 
 
 
  
 
 2006 men's skeleton results (todor66.com)

1984 births
Living people
People from Suhl
German male skeleton racers
Sportspeople from Thuringia
Olympic skeleton racers of Germany
Skeleton racers at the 2006 Winter Olympics
Skeleton racers at the 2010 Winter Olympics
Skeleton racers at the 2014 Winter Olympics
20th-century German people
21st-century German people